Margaret Chantal Dunbar (born 1967), known as Chantal Dunbar, is an Australian author, photojournalist and environmental communications specialist. Her works are usually based on Indigenous, environmental and sustainable tourism issues.

In 2007, Dunbar took over as Editor of Travelling in Australia magazine, a bi-monthly publication that included photography and investigative reporting. The magazine highlighted the issue of traditional hunting rights for the dugong in Far North Queensland and the Torres Straits. MP Greg Hunt raised the issue with media and called for Parliament to review current regulations.

Dunbar co-authored several titles in the "Where to Live Guide" series.

Selected works
Australia's Natural Treasures: with Recipes from Paradise, Laughing Waters Publications (2002)  
Hayman: Great Barrier Reef, with Carol Cheshire, ITelligence (2004) 
Dunk: Isle of Peace and Plenty, with Carol Cheshire, ITelligence (2005)

References

Living people
Australian photojournalists
Australian women journalists
Australian journalists
1967 births